Timothy Paschal Williams is a United States Army major general, and the Adjutant General of Virginia. He commands the Virginia Army National Guard, Virginia Air National Guard, and the Virginia Defense Force. Williams is the co-author of, Let’s Go! The History of the 29th Infantry Division 1917-2001.

Education 
A native of Richmond, Virginia, in 1985 he received his bachelor's degree in Management Science from Virginia Tech's Pamplin College of Business in Blacksburg, Virginia and earned a Master of Arts in Management from Webster University in 1989. A graduate of the US Army War College, Williams earned a Masters in Strategic Studies in 2006 at Carlisle Barracks, Pennsylvania.

Military career

ROTC and U.S. Army Service 
Williams was commissioned as a Field Artillery 2nd Lieutenant upon graduation from Virginia Polytechnic Institute and State University in 1985. He was a member of the Virginia Tech Corps of Cadets and the Regimental Band, the Highty-Tighties. 
He served on active duty in the 3rd Armored Cavalry Regiment in Fort Bliss, Texas. While in the regiment, he served as a fire support team chief, battery fire direction officer, squadron fire support officer and regimental nuclear targeting officer until 1990.

Virginia National Guard 
Upon leaving active service he joined the Virginia Army National Guard.  He commanded at the field artillery battery and battalion level before transferring to the Quartermaster Corps. 
Williams commanded the Virginia Beach-based 329th Regional Support Group for four years.

Return to Civilian Life 
He was a Department of the Army civilian for over a decade, serving in his last assignment as Director of Training Support and Doctrine, G-3, Combined Arms Support Command at Fort Lee, Virginia.

Reactivation for the Global War on Terror to Present Day 
Mobilized in 2003, he supported Operation Noble Eagle where he worked with security operations for US Air Force installations in the mid-Atlantic states. 

He deployed in 2007 to Iraq for Operation Iraqi Freedom where he supported theater level logistics transformation.

His most recent military assignment prior to becoming Adjutant General was as J-8 Director of Resource Management on the Virginia National Guard Joint Staff. 

On June 2, 2014, he was sworn in as the new Adjutant General of Virginia by Deputy Secretary of the Commonwealth Kelly Thomasson and was promoted to the rank of Brigadier General at the Virginia Joint Force Headquarters in Sandston, Virginia.

Promoted to Major General on June 29, 2016, Williams is responsible for the combat readiness of units, and the administration and training of more than 8,600 Virginia Army and Air National Guard personnel.

Family and personal life 
Serving in the National Guard is a tradition for his family. His brother David, a retired lieutenant colonel, father Pat, and grandfather Bill all served in the Virginia National Guard. His son, Troy, currently serves in the Virginia Air National Guard.

Williams was appointed as an ex-officio member of the Virginia Military Institute’s Board of Visitors on June 2, 2014.

Awards and decorations

Dates of promotion
Second Lieutenant USA - 7 June 1985
First Lieutenant USA - 2 November 1986
Captain ARNG - 14 November 1990
Major ARNG - 22 September 1994
Lieutenant Colonel ARNG - 14 January 2000
Colonel ARNG - 9 July 2004 
Brigadier General ARNG - June 2, 2014 
Major General ARNG -  June 29, 2016

Bibliography
 Let’s Go! The History of the 29th Infantry Division 1917-2001, Timothy Williams, Alexander F. Barnes, and Chris Calkins, Schiffer Publishing, Ltd. 2014

References

Living people
Year of birth missing (living people)
Virginia National Guard personnel
Military personnel from Richmond, Virginia
United States Army personnel of the Iraq War
United States Army War College alumni
Recipients of the Legion of Merit
United States Army generals
National Guard (United States) generals
Virginia Tech alumni